The Copa do Brasil 2008 was the 20th staging of the Copa do Brasil, starting on February 13, 2008 and finishing on June 11, 2008. It was played by 64 teams, either qualified through their respected state championships (54) or by the CBF Rankings (10). The clubs that played the Copa Libertadores 2008 didn't participate in the Copa do Brasil 2008 because of scheduling problems. It was won by Sport-PE.

Format
The tournament was played in two-legged knockout stages. In the first two rounds the away team automatically goes through to the next round if they beat the home team by a 2-goal difference or more in the first leg.

The away goals rule was used in the Copa do Brasil, which is an unusual feature when compared to other South American competitions. For example, the Copa Libertadores did not adopt this rule until 2005.

Copa do Brasil is an opportunity for teams from smaller states to play against the big teams and episodes of giant-killing have happened at a regular rate throughout the competition history.

The winner automatically qualifies for the next year's Copa Libertadores, which prevents a team from winning the Copa do Brasil twice in a row.

Results

Bracket 1

Bracket 2

Bracket 3

Bracket 4

Final phase

Top scorers
Updated to games played 2008-06-06

Champion

External links
 Copa do Brasil 2008 at RSSSF
 Copa do Brasil at CBF

Copa Do Brasil, 2008
Copa Do Brasil, 2008
2008